Chínipas is one of the 67 municipalities of Chihuahua, in northern Mexico. The municipal seat lies at Chínipas de Almada. The municipality covers an area of 2,278.9 km².

As of 2010, the municipality had a total population of 8,441, up from 7,233 as of 2005.

The municipality had 256 localities, the largest of which (with 2010 populations in parentheses) were: Chínipas de Almada (1,934), classified as urban, and Milpillas (1,025), classified as rural.

References

Municipalities of Chihuahua (state)